Earthlings is a 2005 American documentary film about humanity's use of other animals as pets, food, clothing, entertainment, and for scientific research. The film is narrated by Joaquin Phoenix, features music by Moby, and was directed by Shaun Monson, executive produced by Libra Max and co-produced by Maggie Q. A sequel titled Unity was released in 2015.

Synopsis
Covering factory farms, pet stores, puppy mills, animal experimentation, Earthlings includes footage obtained through the use of hidden cameras to chronicle the day-to-day practices of some of the largest industries in the world, all of which rely on animals. Then, the film draws parallels between speciesism and racism, sexism, and more.

Production
The film started off as footage that writer, director, and producer Shaun Monson had shot at animal shelters around Los Angeles in 1999. Monson originally shot the footage for PSAs on spaying and neutering pets, but what he saw moved him so much that he turned it into a documentary. The film would take another six years to complete because of the difficulty of obtaining footage within these industries.

Promotion
Joaquin Phoenix commented on the documentary, "Of all the films I have ever made, this is the one that gets people talking the most. For every one person who sees Earthlings, they will tell three." Animal rights philosopher Tom Regan remarked, "For those who watch Earthlings, the world will never be the same."

Accolades
In 2005, Earthlings premiered at the Artivist Film Festival (where it won Best Documentary Feature), followed by the Boston International Film Festival (where it won the Best Content Award) and the San Diego Film Festival (where it won Best Documentary Film, as well as the Humanitarian Award to Phoenix for his work on the film).

Connection to the Lutsk hostage crisis

On July 21, 2020, Maksym Kryvosh seized a bus with 13 people on board in the city of Lutsk, Volyn Oblast, Ukraine, and demanded, among other things, that President of Ukraine Volodymyr Zelensky publish a post in which he recommended Earthlings to everyone. Within a few hours, Zelensky fulfilled Kryvosh's demand, posting a Facebook video in which he said in Russian, "Everyone should watch the 2005 film Earthlings." Kryvosh then released three hostages. After a standoff with police, Kryvosh was arrested, the other 10 hostages were released, all unharmed, and the President's recommendation video was deleted.

The next day, Shaun Monson reacted to the incident by saying that "Earthlings does not endorse or condone acts of terror, as its message is one of compassion for all beings. [...] Our hearts go out to all those impacted by this ordeal, to their families, as well as the authorities who ensured that no lives were lost. May we move forward with non-violence toward all."

See also

 List of vegan media
 Our Daily Bread (2005 film)
 Pig Business (film)
 Dominion (film)

References

External links

 
 
 

2005 documentary films
2005 films
American documentary films
Anti-modernist films
Documentary films about animal cruelty
Documentary films about animal rights
Documentary films about animal testing
Documentary films about vegetarianism
Films shot in Los Angeles County, California
Vegetarianism in the United States
2000s English-language films
2000s American films